Ptilomyoides is a genus of parasitic flies in the family Tachinidae.

Distribution
Brazil

Species
Ptilomyoides bequaerti (Curran, 1925)

References

Diptera of South America
Dexiinae
Tachinidae genera
Monotypic Brachycera genera
Taxa named by Charles Howard Curran